Jan Filip Backlund (born 14 April 1990 in Västerås, Västmanland) is a Swedish motorcycle road racer nicknamed ‘The Teacher' He currently competes in the British Superbike Championship for Quattro Plant Cool Kawasaki.

Career

Filip began riding motorcycles at the age of three, when his father bought him a Honda 50cc bike. He began competing in motocross at seven years old, riding in the 60cc class.
 
In 2001, after five years in motocross, he stopped racing in the series as his parents felt it was too dangerous. After attempting different forms of motorsport and motorcycling, at the age of 12 he fell in love with Mini Moto and began to race all over Europe with his brother.
 
At 13 years of age, Filip was granted an exemption to race 125cc bikes in Scandinavia and that year became the first rider of that age to win the championship. He followed this up in 250cc in 2004 and again won the title on his first attempt.

Suzuki then invited him to ride in the Superstock 600cc Veidec Trophy in Scandinavia, where he took two wins in two years of competition.  
 
From 2007, Filip competed in 1000cc Superbikes, competing in the FIM Superstock Youth World Championship in 2008, before winning two gold medals in the Swedish Championships in 2009 and 2011. He also has raced in Endurance WC races and German IDM Superbikes.
 
In 2012, he moved to the United Kingdom and entered the National Superstock 1000 Championship. He competed in the series for two seasons, finishing third in 2013. Since 2014, Filip has ridden in the British Superbike Championship, starting with four rounds that year and then full programmes in 2015 & 2016 for Kawasaki.
 
Before the 2016 campaign, he fell while testing for the new season at Donington Park and broke his collarbone.

Personal

Filip now resides in Burton-upon-Trent, Staffordshire in the United Kingdom where he lives with his girlfriend and their cat Felicia. He runs a successful racing school across Europe and enjoys cycling. He is also interested in art, music, cooking and interior design.

Racing record

Career summary

British Superbike Championship

References

1990 births
Living people
Swedish motorcycle racers
British Superbike Championship riders
Sportspeople from Västerås